The following lists events that happened during 1981 in Chile.

Incumbents
President of Chile: Augusto Pinochet

Events

January
January 10 – The Santa Maria Tower is inaugurated on the slopes of San Cristóbal Hill in the commune of Providencia, the highest in the country until 1994.

February
February 18–23 – The XXII Viña del Mar International Song Festival is held. Its conductors are Antonio Vodanovic and María Olga Fernández.
February 28 – The Viña del Mar psychopaths murder Fernando Lagunas Alfaro, a businessman, and Delia del Carmen González Apablaza, a prostitute known by the nickname of La Topogigio near the Estero Marga Marga River of Viña del Mar.

March
March 2 – The Catholic University of the North expels the writer from Antofagasta Andrés Sabella, Doctor Honoris Causa and member of the Academia Chilena de la Lengua.
March 6 – Decree Law N1 1-3260 is created, which created new administrative zones (the commune).
March 11 – the Political Constitution of the Republic of Chile of 1980, plebiscitated and approved on September 11 of the previous year, comes into force. After Te Deum, the military government moved to La Moneda, leaving the Diego Portales Building as Legislative Power until 1990.
March 21 – Fire in the Torre Santa María. The fire starts at 10:00 on the tenth floor; 11 people die. The incident exposes the problem of fires in tall buildings, and plans begin to address the issue.

April

May
May 1 – The new pension system comes into force, with which the Pension Fund Administrators (AFP) appear.
May 15 – Education is municipalized, to decentralize educational administration.
May 18 – A violent tornado destroys the center of San Carlos.
May 22 – The Viña del Mar Sugar Refinery Company (CRAV) declares bankruptcy.
May 25 – The Viña del Mar psychopaths assassinate taxi driver Luis Morales Álvarez near Reñaca Beach and worker Jorge Inostroza on the road to Concón, where they also rape Margarita Santibáñez Ibaceta .

June

July
July 23–29 – Strong temperature drops are recorded in much of the country. Snow falls in cities like La Serena and Copiapó, where previously thought impossible.
July 28 – The Viña del Mar psychopaths murder the taxi driver Raúl Aedo León on Camino El Olivar and Tomás Noguera Inostroza, a bank employee, on the road to Limache and they also rape Ana María Riveros.

August
August 23 – The Military Junta of the Military Government establishes September 11 as a holiday with the title of National Liberation Day.

September
September 1 – The Spanish writer Corín Tellado visits the country.

October
October 16 – An earthquake measuring 7.5 on the Richter scale affects the area of La Ligua and Petorca. No fatalities were reported.
October 30 – The Ministry of Finance announces the intervention of the Linares, Talca, Fomento de Valparaíso, and Español-Chile banks. The measure becomes effective on November 2.

November
November 1 – The Viña del Mar psychopaths assassinated Jaime Ventura and Roxana Venegas in the Caleta Abarca sector, under the Capuchin Bridge of Viña del Mar. This was the last crime committed by the criminals.
November 26 – The Apumanque shopping center is inaugurated, in the commune of Las Condes.
November 27 – A bus from the Flecha Dorada company collides with a truck near the city of San Carlos, resulting in 30 deaths and 17 injuries.

December
December 11–12 – The 1981 Chilean telethon is held.
December 11 – Agents of the CNI, Investigations and Carabineros, kill the MIR militants María Verónica Cienfuegos and Sergio Flores in a house on Rivadavia street in the commune of San Joaquín.

Births
11 January – Jaime Valdés
1 February – Nelson Pinto
15 February – Cristian Muñoz (racewalker)
26 February – Pamela Díaz
15 March – Cristián Arriagada
16 March – Leonardo Monje
9 May – Johnny Herrera (goalkeeper)
10 May – Humberto Suazo
31 May – Cristián Canío
26 July – Miguel Ángel Ayala
30 July – Eduardo Lobos
4 August – Ismael Fuentes
20 August – Mario Esteban Berríos
21 August – Jonathan Novoa
9 September – Julio Peralta
17 September – Gonzalo Villagra
27 October – Marcel Holmberg
3 November – Rodrigo Millar
22 November – Braulio Leal
12 December – Wladimir Herrera

Deaths
23 May – Laura Allende (b. 1911)

References 

 
Years of the 20th century in Chile
Chile